Richard T. Lee (born 1954) is a Canadian politician. A city councillor in Burnaby, British Columbia (BC) since 2022, he previously represented the electoral district of Burnaby North in the Legislative Assembly of British Columbia from 2001 to 2017, as part of the BC Liberal caucus.

Background 
Born in Zhongshan, People's Republic of China in 1954, Lee lived in Hong Kong and Macau before moving to Canada in 1971 to join his grandfather, who entered the country in 1913 by paying the Chinese head tax. He studied physics and mathematics at the University of British Columbia, earning a bachelor of science degree in 1976 and a master of science degree in 1980; he also worked at the university as a programmer analyst. He has lived in Burnaby since 1986 with his wife Anne, with whom he raised three children.

Political career 
A member of the BC Liberal Party since 1993, Lee first contested the riding of Burnaby North in the 1996 election, but lost to Pietro Calendino of the BC New Democratic Party (NDP). He faced Calendino again in the 2001 election, this time winning the seat with 54.37% of the vote. He was re-elected in the 2005, 2009 and 2013 elections before losing to the NDP's Janet Routledge in 2017.

During his time as member of the Legislative Assembly (MLA), he served as Parliamentary Secretary for the Asia-Pacific Initiative from June 2005 to May 2009, as well as deputy chair of the Special Committee to Appoint a Merit Commissioner and chair of the Government Caucus Asian Economic Development Committee. He was appointed Parliamentary Secretary for the Asia Pacific Strategy to the Minister of International Trade and Minister Responsible for the Asia Pacific Strategy and Multiculturalism in June 2013, and Parliamentary Secretary for traditional Chinese medicine in December of the same year.

In April 2015, a constituent in Burnaby North launched a recall petition under the BC Elections Act. The proponent turned in less than 10% of the required number of signatures and the petition failed.

In September 2015, Lee was appointed Deputy Speaker of the Legislative Assembly, the first MLA of Asian descent in B.C. to serve in that capacity.

Following the resignation of Karen Wang, Lee took over as the Liberal Party of Canada's candidate in the 2019 Burnaby South federal by-election, against New Democratic Party leader Jagmeet Singh and Conservative Party of Canada's Jay Shin. Lee finished in second place behind Singh, with 26% of the vote. He declined to seek the Liberal's nomination for Burnaby South in the October 2019 federal election on account of his wife's illness.

Lee joined municipal party One Burnaby in 2022, and was elected to the Burnaby City Council in that year's municipal election.

2015 detention in China 

In November 2015, Lee and his family were detained by the Chinese Public Security Bureau upon arrival to Shanghai, China. During his detention, Chinese officials examined his personal phone, and BC Legislative Assembly phone. Lee and his family were released without charge and was forcibly removed from China.

Lee later recounted his experience to various members of Canada's Federal Cabinet and then-Chinese ambassador to Canada Lu Shaye, but received no acknowledgement of the incident from both the Government of Canada, nor the Government of China. Lee elected not to publicly disclose the incident until November 2019, citing concerns of creating a rift in Canada–China bilateral relations.

The Prime Minister's Office acknowledged receipt of Lee's correspondence 4 years later, in November 2019.

Partial electoral results

References

External links 
 Richard T. Lee's official MLA site
  Legislative Assembly of British Columbia, North Burnaby MLA: Richard T. Lee

1954 births
Living people
British Columbia Liberal Party MLAs
Liberal Party of Canada candidates for the Canadian House of Commons
Chinese emigrants to Canada
Naturalized citizens of Canada
Burnaby city councillors
People from Zhongshan
21st-century Canadian politicians
Canadian politicians of Chinese descent
University of British Columbia alumni